Wieżyca (Kashubian Wieżëca, German Turmberg) is a hill located in northern Poland, in the historical region of Kashubia, some 40 kilometers southwest of Gdańsk. With elevation of 329 metres above sea level, it is the highest peak of central and northern Poland. Its top is covered by a forest, and the hill was the object of pagan cult of ancient Slavs. Wieżyca is a popular tourist area, with a ski lift and a ski slope.

See also 
 Geography of Poland

External links
 "Szymbark Wiezyca and the fifth time inwazjii place one thousand red hats" - NaszeMiasto
 "Wiezyca. Koszałkowo i Kotlinka Koszałkowo and Kotlinka" - NaszeMiasto
 "Tourism - common cause" - Wiadomości Sierakowickie

Landforms of Pomeranian Voivodeship
Mountains of Poland
Tourist attractions in Pomeranian Voivodeship